The Broken Violin is an American film that was released in 1923. It was directed by John Francis Dillon. It was produced by Atlantic Features and distributed by Arrow Film Corporation It is a melodrama. A 1923 publication described the film as "heart interest laid on thick."

Plot 
Variety wrote, "The story is of an imposter endeavoring to secure the millions rightfully belonging to another. His ruse works for a time, but the rightful heir finally comes into his own and incidentally wins the girl which the other hand had also attempted to secure".

Reception 
A review in Variety reads, "These long drawn-out melodramas are pretty tough on summer-time audiences" and "Melodramatics are the stock in trade of this production, with the story bringing forth only old bits in this line to create interest. The tale has a flimsy love angle weakly told, with the theme in general falling short of holding attention".

Cast
 Dorothy Mackaill as Constance Morley
Reed Howes as John Ellsworth
 Zena Keefe as Governess
Warren Cook as Thomas Kitterly
Joseph Blake as Jeremy Ellsworth
Henry Sedley as James Gault
Sydney Deane as Dr. Mason
 Rita Rogan as Beatrice Ellsworth
 J.H. Lewis as Jules Davega
 Gladden James as Phil Carter / Floyd Watson
 Edward Roseman as Half-Wit

See also 

 The Broken Violin (1928 film)

References

External links
 

1923 films
1920s English-language films
American silent feature films
Films directed by John Francis Dillon
Silent American drama films
1923 drama films
American black-and-white films
Arrow Film Corporation films
1920s American films